The 1984 United States presidential election in Oklahoma took place on November 6, 1984. All 50 states and the District of Columbia, were part of the 1984 United States presidential election. Voters chose eight electors to the Electoral College, which selected the president and vice president of the United States.

Oklahoma was won by incumbent United States President Ronald Reagan of California, who was running against former Vice President Walter Mondale of Minnesota. Reagan ran for a second time with former C.I.A. Director George H. W. Bush of Texas, and Mondale ran with Representative Geraldine Ferraro of New York, the first major female candidate for the vice presidency. Reagan won all but three counties, and lost the three he did lose by a combined aggregate of only 381 votes.

Nearly every county in Oklahoma voted in majority for the Republican candidate, a particularly strong turn out even in this typically archconservative state. This trend included Oklahoma City's Oklahoma County. Reagan did best in Texas County, and Mondale did best in Hughes County. The former Democratic stronghold in the Southeastern part of the state is evident in this election as only marginally Republican. Oklahoma weighed in for this election as 10% more Republican than the national average.

Reagan won the election in Oklahoma with a resounding 38-point sweep-out landslide. While Oklahoma typically voted conservative at the time, the election results in Oklahoma are also reflective of a nationwide reconsolidation of base for the Republican Party which took place through the 1980s; called by Reagan the "second American Revolution." This was most evident during the 1984 presidential election.

Democratic platform
Walter Mondale accepted the Democratic nomination for presidency after pulling narrowly ahead of Senator Gary Hart of Colorado and Rev. Jesse Jackson of Illinois – his main contenders during what would be a very contentious Democratic primary. During the primary campaign, Mondale was vocal about reduction of government spending, and, in particular, was vocal against heightened military spending on the nuclear arms race against the Soviet Union, which was reaching its peak on both sides in the early 1980s.

Taking a (what was becoming the traditional liberal) stance on the social issues of the day, Mondale advocated for gun control, the right to choose regarding abortion, and strongly opposed the repeal of laws regarding institutionalized prayer in public schools. He also criticized Reagan for what he charged was his economic marginalization of the poor, stating that Reagan's reelection campaign was "a happy talk campaign," not focused on the real issues at hand.

A very significant political move during this election: the Democratic Party nominated Representative Geraldine Ferraro to run with Mondale as Vice-President. Ferraro is the first female candidate to receive such a nomination in United States history. She said in an interview at the 1984 Democratic National Convention that this action "opened a door which will never be closed again," speaking to the role of women in politics.

Republican platform

By 1984, Reagan was very popular with voters across the nation as the President who saw them out of the economic stagflation of the early and middle 1970's, and into a period of (relative) economic stability.

The economic success seen under Reagan was politically accomplished (principally) in two ways. The first was initiation of deep tax cuts for the wealthy, and the second was a wide-spectrum of tax cuts for crude oil production and refinement, namely, with the 1980 Windfall profits tax cuts. These policies were augmented with a call for heightened military spending, and the cutting of social welfare programs for the poor. Collectively called "Reaganomics", these economic policies were established through several pieces of legislation passed between 1980 and 1987.

Some of these new policies also arguably curbed several existing tax loopholes, preferences, and exceptions, but Reaganomics is typically remembered for its trickle down effect of taxing poor Americans more than rich ones. Reaganomics has (along with legislation passed under presidents George H. W. Bush and Bill Clinton) been criticized by many analysts as "setting the stage" for economic troubles in the United States after 2007, such as the Great Recession.

Virtually unopposed during the Republican primaries, Reagan ran on a campaign of furthering his economic policies. Reagan vowed to continue his "war on drugs," passing sweeping legislation after the 1984 election in support of mandatory minimum sentences for drug possession.  Furthermore, taking a (what was becoming the traditional conservative) stance on the social issues of the day, Reagan strongly opposed legislation regarding comprehension of gay marriage, abortion, and (to a lesser extent) environmentalism, regarding the final as simply being bad for business.

Results

Results by county

Slates of Electors
Democrat: Carl Albert, Margaret Watson, Dorris Nash, Doris Montgomery, James W. Brown, Edna Mae Phelps, Ed Edmondson, Robert M. Kerr

Republican: Carolyn Branham, Joe Coleman, Ricky Farmer, Larry Lahman, Stuart Meltzer, Luke Reid, Maria Mendez, Mary Helen Swanson

Libertarian: Loren L. Baker, Constance F. Hill, Clare A. Mendus, Thomas J. Laurent III, Andrea Bross, Brian Holk, Monte L. Fruits, Brenda Bromiley

See also
 United States presidential elections in Oklahoma
 Presidency of Ronald Reagan

References

Oklahoma
1984
1984 Oklahoma elections